The canons of page construction are historical reconstructions, based on careful measurement of extant books and what is known of the mathematics and engineering methods of the time, of manuscript-framework methods that may have been used in Medieval- or Renaissance-era book design to divide a page into pleasing proportions. Since their popularization in the 20th century, these canons have influenced modern-day book design in the ways that page proportions, margins and type areas (print spaces) of books are constructed.

The notion of canons, or laws of form, of book page construction was popularized by Jan Tschichold in the mid to late twentieth century, based on the work of J. A. van de Graaf, Raúl Rosarivo, Hans Kayser, and others. Tschichold wrote, "Though largely forgotten today, methods and rules upon which it is impossible to improve have been developed for centuries. Kayser's 1946 Ein harmonikaler Teilungskanon had earlier used the term canon in this context.

Typographers and book designers are influenced by these principles to this day in page layout, with variations related to the availability of standardized paper sizes, and the diverse types of commercially printed books.

Van de Graaf canon 

The Van de Graaf canon is a historical reconstruction of a method that may have been used in book design to divide a page in pleasing proportions. This canon is also known as the "secret canon" used in many medieval manuscripts and incunabula.

The geometrical solution of the construction of Van de Graaf's canon, which works for any page width:height ratio, enables the book designer to position the type area in a specific area of the page. Using the canon, the proportions are maintained while creating pleasing and functional margins of size 1/9 and 2/9 of the page size. The resulting inner margin is one-half of the outer margin, and of proportions 2:3:4:6 (inner:top:outer:bottom) when the page proportion is 2:3 (more generally 1:R:2:2R for page proportion 1:R). This method was discovered by Van de Graaf, and used by Tschichold and other contemporary designers; they speculate that it may be older. The page proportions vary, but most commonly used is the 2:3 proportion. Tschichold writes "For purposes of better comparison I have based his figure on a page proportion of 2:3, which Van de Graaf does not use." In this canon the type area and page size are of same proportions, and the height of the type area equals the page width. This canon was popularized by Jan Tschichold in his book The Form of the Book.

Robert Bringhurst, in his The Elements of Typographic Style, asserts that the proportions that are useful for the shapes of pages are equally useful in shaping and positioning the textblock. This was often the case in medieval books, although later on in the Renaissance, typographers preferred to apply a more polyphonic page in which the proportions of page and textblock would differ.

Golden canon 

 
Tschichold's "golden canon of page construction" is based on simple integer ratios, equivalent to Rosarivo's "typographical divine proportion".

Interpretation of Rosarivo 
Raúl Rosarivo analyzed Renaissance-era books with the help of a drafting compass and a ruler, and concluded in his Divina proporción tipográfica ("Typographical Divine Proportion", first published in 1947) that Gutenberg, Peter Schöffer, Nicolaus Jenson and others had applied the golden canon of page construction in their works. According to Rosarivo, his work and assertion that Gutenberg used the "golden number" 2:3, or "secret number" as he called it, to establish the harmonic relationships between the diverse parts of a work, was analyzed by experts at the Gutenberg Museum and re-published in the Gutenberg-Jahrbuch, its official magazine.
Ros Vicente points out that Rosarivo "demonstrates that Gutenberg had a module different from the well-known one of Luca Pacioli" (the golden ratio).

Tschichold also interprets Rosarivo's golden number as 2:3, saying:

The figures he refers to are reproduced in combination here.

John Man's interpretation of Gutenberg 
Historian John Man suggests that both the Gutenberg Bible's pages and printed area were based on the golden ratio (commonly approximated as the decimal 0.618 or the ratio 5:8). He quotes the dimensions of Gutenberg's half-folio Bible page as 30.7 x 44.5 cm, a ratio of 0.690, close to Rosarivo's golden 2:3 (0.667) but not to the golden ratio (0.618).

Tschichold and the golden ratio 
Building on Rosarivo's work, contemporary experts in book design such as Jan Tschichold and Richard Hendel assert as well that the page proportion of the golden ratio has been used in book design, in manuscripts, and incunabula, mostly in those produced between 1550 and 1770. Hendel writes that since Gutenberg's time, books have been most often printed in an upright position, that conform loosely, if not precisely, to the golden ratio.

These page proportions based on the golden ratio, are usually described through its convergents such as 2:3, 3:5, 5:8, 8:13, 13:21, 21:34, etc.

Tschichold says that common ratios for page proportion used in book design include as 2:3, 1:, and the golden ratio. The image with circular arcs depicts the proportions in a medieval manuscript, that according to Tschichold feature a "Page proportion 2:3. Margin proportions 1:1:2:3. Type area in accord with the Golden Section. The lower outer corner of the type area is fixed by a diagonal as well." By accord with the golden ratio, he does not mean exactly equal to, which would conflict with the stated proportions.

Tschichold refers to a construction equivalent to van de Graaf's or Rosarivo's with a 2:3 page ratio as "the Golden Canon of book page construction as it was used during late Gothic times by the finest of scribes." For the canon with the arc construction, which yields a type area ratio closer to the golden ratio, he says "I abstracted from manuscripts that are older yet. While beautiful, it would hardly be useful today."

Of the different page proportions that such a canon can be applied to, he says "Book pages come in many proportions, i.e., relationships between width and height. Everybody knows, at least from hearsay, the proportion of the Golden Section, exactly 1:1.618. A ratio of 5:8 is no more than an approximation of the Golden Section. It would be difficult to maintain the same opinion about a ratio of 2:3."

Tschichold also expresses a preference for certain ratios over others: "The geometrically definable irrational page proportions like 1:1.618 (Golden Section), 1:, 1:, 1:, 1:1.538, and the simple rational proportions of 1:2, 2:3, 5:8 and 5:9 I call clear, intentional and definite. All others are unclear and accidental ratios. The difference between a clear and an unclear ratio, though frequently slight, is noticeable… Many books show none of the clear proportions, but accidental ones."

John Man's quoted Gutenberg page sizes are in a proportion not very close to the golden ratio, but Rosarivo's or van de Graaf's construction is applied by Tschichold to make a pleasing type area on pages of arbitrary proportions, even such accidental ones.

Current applications 
Richard Hendel, associate director of the University of North Carolina Press, describes book design as a craft with its own traditions and a relatively small body of accepted rules. The dust cover of his book, On Book Design, features the Van de Graaf canon.

Christopher Burke, in his book on German typographer Paul Renner, creator of the Futura typeface, described his views about page proportions:

Bringhurst describes a book page as a tangible proportion, which together with the textblock produce an antiphonal geometry, which has the capability to bind the reader to the book, or conversely put the reader's nerve on edge or drive the reader away.

See also 
 Book
 Grid
 Page layout

Footnotes

References 

 
 
 
 
  shows the Van de Graaf canon and a variant that divides the page into twelfths)

Further reading 

 
 Luca Pacioli, De Divina Proportione (1509)

External links 
 
 
 

Book design
Page layout
Typography
de:Satzspiegel